During the seven years 1933 to 1939, Herbert Sutcliffe played throughout the period for Yorkshire during one of the club's most successful phases.  His Test career ended in 1935 but he formed a new opening partnership for Yorkshire with the young Len Hutton.  In 1939, he was the first Yorkshire player to be called up for military service as the Second World War loomed.

1933 English cricket season

Having returned to England from the 1932–33 bodyline tour, Herbert Sutcliffe could not repeat his outstanding form of the 1932 season but he still scored a considerable 2,211 runs at 47.04, although it was his lowest tally in a dry summer since 1921.  He completed 7 centuries with a highest score of 205 against Warwickshire at Edgbaston.  His season highlight was perhaps his score of 113, including ten sixes, against Northamptonshire on a bad pitch at Town Ground, Kettering.

Sutcliffe played in the first two Tests against the West Indies but missed the Third Test because of injury.  England won the First and Third Tests while the Second Test was drawn.  Sutcliffe had only two innings, scoring 21 in the First Test at Lord's and 20 in the Second Test at Old Trafford.

Yorkshire retained the County Championship, completing a hat-trick of titles since 1931.  Brian Sellers was appointed team captain before the season and proved himself a brilliant tactician and leader.  The usual Yorkshire line-up was Sutcliffe, Holmes, Mitchell, Leyland, Wilf Barber, Sellers, Wood, Verity, Macaulay, Arthur Rhodes and Bowes.  Verity, Bowes and Macaulay all took over 100 wickets in the season and Sutcliffe, Leyland, Mitchell and Barber all exceeded 1,000 runs.  Percy Holmes, however, had a poor season by his standards.  He was dogged by a painful knee injury sustained in 1932 and could only score 763 runs at 19.65 with a highest score of just 65.  In August, Yorkshire announced that they would not re-engage Holmes after the 1933 season and so Sutcliffe lost the opening partner of all his 15 seasons so far at Yorkshire; Holmes and Sutcliffe both thought that Yorkshire were premature in making this decision.

1934 English cricket season

Sutcliffe scored 304 runs at 50.66 in four Tests against Australia in 1934.  He made three half-centuries with a highest score of 69 not out in the Third Test at Old Trafford.  He missed the Fourth Test because of injury.

It was hoped that the 1934 series would heal the rift that had arisen between England and Australia as a result of the bodyline series and it succeeded in doing that.  With Jardine gone and in the absence of Wyatt, England had a new captain in Cyril Walters of Worcestershire for the First Test at Trent Bridge.  He opened the innings with Sutcliffe and they shared a stand of 45 after Australia had been dismissed for 374.  Walters was out for 17 and Sutcliffe made 62 in a total of 268.  Australia declared their second innings on 273–8, a lead of 379.  Although Sutcliffe and Walters made another sound start of 51 before Sutcliffe was out for 24, England collapsed to be all out for 141, Walters making top score with 46.  The damage was done by O'Reilly and Grimmett who took 11 and 8 wickets respectively.

Wyatt returned to captain England in the Second Test at Lord's which England won by an innings and 38 runs after centuries by Leyland and Ames were followed by one of Verity's greatest bowling performances.  He took 7–61 and 8–43 as Australia floundered.  Sutcliffe again opened with Walters but was out for 20 at 70–1, while Walters went to score 82.

The Third Test at Old Trafford was drawn after England scored 627 and Australia replied with 491, the two first innings taking play into the final day.  England then declared at 123–0, setting Australia a target of 259, impossible in the time remaining.  Australia safely reached 66–1 at the close.  In the first innings, Sutcliffe batted very carefully and scored slowly.  Walters made 52 out of their opening stand of 68 and Sutcliffe went on to make 63.  In the second innings, Sutcliffe outscored Walters making 69 not out to his partner's 50 not out.

Having missed the drawn Fourth Test at Headingley, Sutcliffe returned for the series decider at The Oval but could do little as Australia won the toss and scored 701 before winning the match by a massive 562 runs.  Ponsford (266) and Bradman (244) effectively settled the match and the series with a stand of 451 for the second wicket.  Sutcliffe (38) and Walters (64) began with another century stand, scoring 104 before Sutcliffe was caught behind off Grimmett.  England could have been made to follow on but Woodfull chose to bat again and Australia extended their lead to over 700.  In the final innings, England collapsed against Grimmett and O'Reilly who bowled them out for 145, Sutcliffe making 28.

Sutcliffe's first-class aggregate for the 1934 season was 2,023 runs at 49.34 with 4 centuries and a highest score of 203 against Surrey at The Oval.  Yorkshire had a comparatively poor season by their recent standards and finished 6th in the County Championship behind Lancashire.  The team was never really settled and the loss of Holmes resulted in a number of opening partnerships being tried.  Sutcliffe generally opened with Mitchell but Barber also opened and so, in 14 matches, did a rising star from Pudsey called Len Hutton, who was 18 in June 1934.  Sutcliffe and Hutton opened for Yorkshire in one championship match in 1934 which was the game against Essex at The Circle, Kingston upon Hull, in July.  They shared 14 in the first innings but then Hutton was out and Sutcliffe went on to make 166.  In the second innings, Hutton opened with Mitchell and was out without scoring.  Sutcliffe did not bat and Yorkshire won comfortably by 123 runs.  Yorkshire had too many players missing several matches each: the team played 30 championship games but none of Bowes, Leyland, Macaulay, Sutcliffe or Verity managed to appear in 20.  Cyril Turner and Frank Smailes became first-team regulars.

1935 English cricket season

Sutcliffe began the Test series against South Africa at Trent Bridge as England's first-choice opener, partnering Bob Wyatt.  They put on 118 for the first wicket before Sutcliffe was out for 61.  Wyatt went on to score 149 and South Africa had to follow on but, with rain stopping play, the match was drawn.

South Africa recovered to win the Second Test at Lord's by 157 runs and, as the remaining three Tests were all drawn, this gave them their first series win in England.  Sutcliffe again opened with Wyatt and scored 3 and 38, the latter being England's top score in the second innings, which was played after the pitch had been ruined by leatherjackets.  England's chief selector Pelham Warner described 1935 as "the year of the leatherjacket, which had descended on Lord's and caused it to look like the sand on the sea-shore".

This match was Sutcliffe's last Test for England.  He was unable through a leg injury to play in the Third Test, in which Wyatt opened with Denis Smith of Derbyshire, but then he never recovered his place when he was fit again.  Wisden's view was that England wished to try out younger players but it pointed out that Sutcliffe "remains a prolific runscorer".  Sutcliffe's record in Test cricket is outstanding.  As shown by the adjacent graph, he is the only English batsman who has averaged more than 60 runs per innings in a completed career and his statistical record compares favourably with anyone except Don Bradman.  Uniquely, Sutcliffe's batting average never dropped below 60 throughout his entire Test career and Javed Miandad is the only other player whose average never dropped below 50 in a career of at least 20 innings.

A new leg before wicket rule was tried in 1935, with the agreement of the South African tourists.  Its essential feature was that "a batsman could be given out if the ball pitched outside the off stump and would, on the umpire's opinion, have hit the wicket, the batsman's leg or legs being in front of the stumps at the moment of impact".  It was, therefore, designed to limit the amount of pad play but the MCC Committee was at pains to obtain the views of numerous parties and a series of conferences were held at Lord's to discuss the ruling, Sutcliffe being invited to one.  As an exponent of pad play, Sutcliffe "anticipated for himself the most lugubrious future".  However, Pelham Warner says it was pointed out to him that "he was grossly underrating his abilities, which turned out to be true, and he was one of the earliest converts".

Sutcliffe went on to finish second (i.e., of batsmen playing at least 10 completed innings) in the 1935 first-class averages, behind Walter Hammond, scoring 2,494 runs at 48.90 with 8 centuries and a highest score of 212 against Leicestershire.

The end of Sutcliffe's Test career meant that, from then on, he was always available for Yorkshire, who regained the County Championship title in 1935.  Verity and Bowes, well supported by Smailes, were again the key bowlers.  George Macaulay played his final season and there were two newcomers in Paul Gibb and Ellis Robinson.  Sutcliffe scored 1,966 runs in the championship and was easily the county's outstanding batsman.  Barber, who had a fine season, Mitchell and the wicket-keeper Arthur Wood were the only others to exceed 1,000 runs.  Despite being in the champion team, Yorkshire's batsmen scored only 15 centuries in 30 matches: Barber scored 4 and Wood, Gibb and Hutton scored 1 each.  Sutcliffe scored 8.

Len Hutton, born in June 1916, was still short of his 19th birthday when he and Sutcliffe opened together against Kent at Park Avenue, Bradford, on Saturday, 1 June 1935.  On a difficult, turning wicket, they had to face Kent's great leg spinner Tich Freeman (who took 13 wickets in the match) and managed to put on 70 together before Yorkshire collapsed to an all out 131, leaving Kent with a first innings lead of 51.  Kent extended that lead on the Monday morning to 191 and Yorkshire, faced with a sticky wicket after heavy overnight rain, were not expected to win.  Thanks to an obdurate and watchful innings by Sutcliffe, who made an outstanding 110, they did win by two wickets.  Sutcliffe scored so slowly at times that some of his own supporters began to complain but Sutcliffe silenced them, after finally taking a single, by holding out his bat and inviting them to come and do better.  It was humorously done and the crowd laughed.  Sutcliffe had a good sense of humour but rarely showed it when batting, which he regarded as altogether too serious a business for jest.

1936 English cricket season

The demands of Test cricket behind him, Sutcliffe played in 29 of Yorkshire's 30 County Championship matches in 1936 but his average fell to 33.30, his worst seasonal performance since the early 1920s.  He scored 1,532 runs with a highest score of 202 against Middlesex at Scarborough among just 3 centuries.

One of his best performances was an innings of 129 against Surrey at Headingley as he shared a first wicket partnership of 230 with Hutton (163).  Leyland scored 163 not out and Yorkshire's total of 519–6 declared enabled them to win by an innings and 185 runs after Bowes and Smailes took the necessary wickets.  The innings of 202 against Middlesex followed a batting collapse by the opposition after Smailes with 7–72 bowled them out for only 127.  Sutcliffe and Leyland (107) added 187 for the third wicket as Yorkshire scored 469.  Middlesex had no answer to Bowes, Smailes and Verity in their second innings and were dismissed for 172 and Yorkshire won by an innings and 170 runs against the team that finished runners-up in the championship.

Yorkshire finished 3rd in the County Championship behind Derbyshire, who claimed their first-ever title.  The preferred Yorkshire line-up was Hutton, Sutcliffe, Leyland, Mitchell, Barber, Turner, Sellers, Verity, Wood, Smailes and Bowes.  A promising newcomer was the future England captain Norman Yardley.  Verity, Smailes and Bowes all took more than 100 wickets and Leyland, Sutcliffe and Hutton exceeded 1,000 runs.  Sutcliffe now had Hutton as his established opening partner and Hutton was making steady progress, scoring 1,108 championship runs at 29.94 with a highest score of 163 against Surrey at Headingley, which was his only century that season.

1937 English cricket season

Sutcliffe's form rallied somewhat in the last three seasons of his career and he formed another outstanding opening partnership with Len Hutton who matured into a Test-class batsman in 1937.  In all first-class matches, Sutcliffe scored 2,162 runs at 44.12 with 4 centuries and a highest score of 189 against Leicestershire at Hull.  Sutcliffe and Hutton put on 315 for the first wicket in that match, Hutton scoring 153.

Yorkshire regained the County Championship and this owed much to the strength of the opening partnership as Sutcliffe and Hutton scored 3550 runs between them in championship matches.  Other good scores were achieved by Barber, Leyland, Mitchell, Turner, Sellers, Wood and Yardley.  Frank Smailes was a very useful all-rounder and Ellis Robinson was successful with his off spin but Verity was again the outstanding bowler.  Bowes missed several championship matches but still averaged about four wickets per game.

1938 English cricket season

In 1938, Sutcliffe scored 1,790 runs in all first-class matches at 41.62 with 5 centuries and a highest score of 142.  Despite several players taking part in the Test series, Yorkshire won a second successive County Championship title.  Sutcliffe, Leyland, Barber and Mitchell all scored more than 1,000 runs in the championship and Sellers made 999.  Verity, Bowes, Robinson and Smailes were a formidable bowling unit.

Sutcliffe faced Australian opposition for the final time in 1938 when he appeared in two matches against the tourists.  The first of these matches was in July for Yorkshire at Bramall Lane.  The match ended at lunch on the third (final) day because of rain but Yorkshire were in the ascendant.  Having dismissed the Australians for 222, Yorkshire had responded with 205 (Sutcliffe 24) but then Bowes, Smailes and Verity had bowled Australia out for only 132 in the second innings.  This was the close of play situation at the end of the second day so Yorkshire needed just 150 to win on the final day.  They reached 83–3 at lunch with Sutcliffe going well on 36 not out.  Sutcliffe faced Australia for the final time in September at North Marine Road in a Scarborough Festival match when he played for H D G Leveson Gower's XI.  Leveson-Gower's XI won by 10 wickets after Bowes and Verity destroyed the Australian batting in the second innings.  Sutcliffe had scored 25 in the first innings and he finished with an unbeaten 36 as he and Hutton guided their team to its target of 46.

1939 English cricket season

Yorkshire completed another hat-trick of County Championships in 1939, the regular players being Sutcliffe, Hutton, Leyland, Mitchell, Barber, Yardley, Turner, Sellers, Smailes, Wood, Verity and Bowes.  A notable debutant was future Test player Willie Watson.  Sutcliffe had injury problems during the season and played in only 21 first-class matches, scoring 1,416 runs at 54.46 with a highest score of 234 not out against Leicestershire at Hull among 6 centuries.

Sutcliffe was now 44 and certainly a "veteran" but he enjoyed a remarkable sequence of four consecutive centuries in May and June which showed any doubters that he was still one of the best opening batsmen around.  Starting with the Roses match at Old Trafford on 27 to 30 May, he scored 165 as Yorkshire replied with 528 for 8 declared to Lancashire's first innings total of 300.  Sutcliffe and Mitchell (136) added 288 for the second wicket.  Bill Bowes (6–43) dismissed Lancashire for 185 in their second innings and Yorkshire won by an innings and 43 runs.  In the next match on 3 to 6 June, Sutcliffe and Hutton equalled their best partnership of 315 against Hampshire at Bramall Lane, Sutcliffe scoring 116 and Hutton 280 not out.  Hampshire won the toss and decided to bat but were bowled out for a modest 174 in only 62.4 overs.  Sutcliffe and Hutton scored 122 by close of play and then took the partnership to 315 on the second morning before Sutcliffe was bowled by George Heath.  Hutton and Barber then advanced the score to 480–1 at which point Sellers declared to allow his bowlers time to dismiss Hampshire again.  They achieved this with Hutton, only ever a change bowler, surprisingly taking 4–40 and Yorkshire won by an innings and 129 runs.  Bill Bowes (6–43) dismissed Lancashire for 185 in their second innings and Yorkshire won by an innings and 43 runs.  Yorkshire then went home to play Leicestershire at The Circle, Kingston upon Hull on 7–9 June.  They won this by an innings and 30 runs after Leicestershire had batted first and scored 366.  Leicestershire's top scorer was New Zealand Test batsman Stewie Dempster who scored 165 not out.  Dempster is one of the handful of batsmen who had a better Test batting average than Sutcliffe.  Sutcliffe led the Yorkshire reply by scoring 234 not out as Yorkshire declared at 500–7.  Sutcliffe and Yardley (74) shared a century stand for the fourth wicket.  Leicestershire's batting was then destroyed by Verity with 8–38 and they were all out for 104 (Dempster 29).  In the next match against Middlesex at Lord's on 10 and 12 June, Yorkshire won by an innings and 246 runs after Sutcliffe (175) and Leyland (180 not out) added 301 for the third wicket.  Sutcliffe was finally caught and bowled by Denis Compton.  Middlesex's batsmen had no answer to Bowes and Verity who bowled them out for 62 and 122.

Although Sutcliffe was to play one more first-class match in 1945, his career effectively ended in August 1939 when he played for Yorkshire against Hampshire at Dean Park Cricket Ground, Bournemouth, on Saturday, 26 August and Monday, 28 August.  Yorkshire won by an innings and 11 runs in just two days.  Sutcliffe and Hutton put on 56 before Hutton was out for 37 and Sutcliffe went on to score 51 before he was out at 117–2, leg before wicket to George Heath, who thus took his wicket for the second time in 1939.

References

Bibliography
 John Arlott, Arlott on Cricket (ed. David Rayvern Allen), Collins, 1984
 John Arlott, Portrait of the Master, Penguin, 1982
 Barclays World of Cricket, 3rd edition, (ed. E. W. Swanton), Willow Books, 1986. Article on Sutcliffe written by Ian Peebles.
 Derek Birley, A Social History of English Cricket, Aurum, 1999
 Neville Cardus, Close of Play, Sportsmans Book Club edition, 1957, "Sutcliffe and Yorkshire", pp. 1–10
 Bill Frindall, The Wisden Book of Cricket Records, Queen Anne Press, 1986, 
 Alan Gibson, The Cricket Captains of England, Cassell, 1979
 Alan Hill, Herbert Sutcliffe: Cricket Maestro, Stadia, 2007 (2nd edition)
 Douglas Jardine, In Quest of the Ashes, Methuen, 2005
 Ronald Mason, Jack Hobbs, Sportsman's Book Club, 1961
 Pelham Warner, Lords: 1787–1945, Harrap, 1946
 Pelham Warner, Cricket Between Two Wars, Sporting Handbooks, 1946
 Roy Webber, The County Cricket Championship, Sportsman's Book Club, 1958
 Simon Wilde, Number One: The World's Best Batsmen and Bowlers, Gollancz, 1998, 
 Wisden Cricketers' Almanack, various editions from 1920 to 1946
 Graeme Wright, A Wisden Collection, Wisden, 2004

External links
 

English cricket seasons in the 20th century
1933